Patrick Braoudé (born 25 September 1954) is a French actor, director, screenwriter, and producer.

Selected filmography

Producer
 1990: Génial, mes parents divorcent
 1993: Neuf mois
 1996: Amour et confusions
 2000: Deuxième vie
 2004: Iznogoud

Actor
 1983: Ballade sanglante (short-film)
 1984: Femmes de personnes
 1985: Train d'enfer
 1986: Je hais les acteurs
 1990: L'Œil au beur(re) noir
 1987 : L'été en pente douce
 1990 : Génial, mes parents divorcent
 1993 : Neuf mois
 1994: Grossesse nerveuse
 1995: Dis-moi oui
 1996: XY
 1996: Amour et confusions
 1997: Que la lumière soit
 1999: Quasimodo d'El Paris
 1999 : Je veux tout
 2000 : Deuxième vie
 2001: And now... Ladies and Gentlemen
 2003: La Carpe dans la baignoire
 2003: Les Clefs de bagnole
 2003: Tout pout l'oseille
 2006: Girlfriends
 2014: The Missionaries
 2016: Joséphine s'arrondit

Screenwriter
 1986: Black Mic Mac
 1987: L'Œil au beur(re) noir
 1987: Un père et passe
 1990: Génial, mes parents divorcent
 1991: Mohamed Bertrand-Duval
 1993: Neuf mois
 1995: Nine Months
 1996: Amour et confusions
 2000: Deuxième vie
 2004: Iznogoud

See also
1990 in film

References

External links

 
 Patrick Braoudé at mooviees.com

1954 births
Living people
French male film actors
French film producers
French male screenwriters
French screenwriters
20th-century French male actors
21st-century French male actors
French male television actors
Film directors from Paris